Presidential elections were held in Bulgaria on 11 November 2001, with a second round on 18 November. The result was a victory for Georgi Parvanov of the Bulgarian Socialist Party, who won 54.0% of the vote in the second round, defeating incumbent president Petar Stoyanov. Voter turnout was 41.8% in the first round and 55.1% in the second. Parvanov took office in 2002, becoming the first former communist to hold the post since 1990.

Opinion polls

First round

Results

References

Bulgaria
2001 elections in Bulgaria
Presidential elections in Bulgaria
November 2001 events in Europe

bg:Президентски избори в България#Пети президентски избори (2001)